Anadia blakei, also known commonly as Blake's anadia, is an endangered species of lizard in the family Gymnophthalmidae. The species is endemic to Venezuela.

Etymology
A. blakei is named after American ornithologist Emmet "Bob" Reid Blake (1908–1997).

Geographic range
A. blakei is found in the Venezuelan state of Sucre.

Habitat

Description
A. blakei has 28 scales around the body at midbody. It is uniformly brown dorsally, and paler ventrally.

Diet
A. blakei preys upon insects, insect larvae, and slugs.

Reproduction
A. blakei is oviparous.

Conservation status
A. blakei is considered "Endangered" because of its small geographic range, and because of ongoing habitat loss from agricultural expansion and construction of roads and communication antennae.

References

Further reading
Myers CW, Rivas Fuenmayor G, Jadin RC (2009). "New Species of Lizards from Auyantepui and La Escalera in the Venezuelan Guayana, with Notes on "Microteiid" Hemipenes (Squamata: Gymnophthalmidae)". American Museum Novitates (3660): 1–31. (Anadia blakei, pp. 19–24, Figures 12–14, Table 3). (in English, with an abstract in Spanish).
Rivas GA, Molina CR, Ugueto GN, Barros TR, Barrio-Amorós CL, Kok PJR (2012). "Reptiles of Venezuela: an updated and commented checklist". Zootaxa 3211: 1–64.
Schmidt KP (1932). "Reptiles and Amphibians of the Mandel Venezuelan Expedition". Field Museum of Natural History, Zoological Series 18 (7): 159–163. (Anadia blakei, new species, pp. 161–162).

Anadia (genus)
Reptiles of Venezuela
Endemic fauna of Venezuela
Reptiles described in 1932
Taxa named by Karl Patterson Schmidt